Quan Hongchan (born 28 March 2007) is a Chinese diver, national champion, and Olympic champion. She won the gold medal at the 2020 Summer Olympics in the individual 10-metre platform event.

Early life 
Quan was born on 28 March 2007 in Mazhang District of Zhanjiang, Guangdong, China. She is the third of five children born to a family of farmers.

Quan was discovered when a sports academy recruited a group of freshmen to participate in a summer camp for diving. Her parents were very supportive of her decision to start competitive diving. Hongchan's brother Quan Jinhua has said, "She liked diving the first time she tried diving. When we go fishing and she sees water, she likes to play in the water. She likes to go to the beach too."

Career 

In July 2014, at age seven, she started training in diving. In 2018, she joined the Guangdong provincial team.

In October 2020, at age 13, she won the National Diving Championship in the 10-metre platform event. She was encouraged by her coach to participate and had learned all the moves in the three weeks leading up to the competition. In the same month, she joined the national diving team.

At the 2020 Summer Olympics in Tokyo, Quan was the youngest athlete in the Chinese delegation. On 5 August 2021, she won the gold medal in the individual 10-metre platform event with an overall score of 466.20 points, also breaking the previous Olympic record of 447.70 set by Chen Ruolin during the 2008 Summer Olympics. Of her five dives, three were perfect dives, two of which earned straight scores of 10 from all seven judges.

At the 2021 National Games of China, Quan won gold in the team event representing Guangdong. She scored a 413.90 on the 10-metre platform, leading a field that included Olympic teammates Chen Yuxi and Zhang Jiaqi.

In December 2021, Quan participated in the Diving Exhibition Competition held in conjunction with the 2021 FINA World Short Course Swimming Championships in Abu Dhabi, UAE. With three other Chinese divers Wang Han, Lian Junjie and Li Zheng, as a team, Quan performed two rounds of the10-meter platform dive, including her individual dive scored 79.50 points and the mixed synchronized dive with Li Zheng scored 86.40. Using the “splash disappearance technique”, she helped Team China win third place in the competition with 384.20 points in total. This competition was a memorable experience for Quan as the diving platform was located on the coast of Yas Island in Abu Dhabi, and the athletes needed to jump into the sea instead of jumping into the regular swimming pool.

In the summer of 2022, Quan participated in the 2022 World Aquatics Championships, winning two gold medals in the women's synchronized 10 metre platform with Chen Yuxi and the mixed team event with Bai Yuming. She also placed second in the women's 10-metre platform, while her teammate, Chen Yuxi was the champion.

Awards and honours 
 FINA, Top 10 Moments: 2020 Summer Olympics (#10 for being the second youngest diver competing representing China at the Olympic Games to win a gold medal when she was just 14 years, 130 days old)
On 9 August 2021, the Chinese Communist Youth League and the All-China Youth Federation awarded 39 young athletes, including Quan Hongchan, the China Youth May Fourth Medal (China Youth Wusi Medal).
On 31 August 2021, the Guangdong Federation of Trade Unions awarded Quan Hongchan and 11 other Olympic athletes the Guangdong May Day Labor Medal.
On 5 September 2021, Quan Hongchan was awarded the All-China Federation of Trade Unions's National May Day Labor Medal..
On 6 September 2021, the Guangdong Committee of the Communist Youth League and the Guangdong Youth Federation decided to award Quan Hongchan and 12 other athletes the Guangdong Youth May Fourth Medal.

Personal life 
Quan has mentioned making more money to treat her mother's illness as a motivation. Her mother was hit by a car on the way to work in 2017 and suffered a serious injury. She mentioned her mother was hospitalized several times but her family did not tell her because they did not want her to worry while training. 

Quan enjoys playing video games in her free time, particularly PUBG and Honor of Kings.

Other Activities 
On  1, 2 and 3 October 2021, the featured TV program "Quan’s Tour" of Quan Hongchan for the National Day holiday was broadcast on Guangdong Sports Channel. This TV program shows Quan and her teammates visiting the Chimelong Safari Park, Chimelong Paradise and Chimelong Ocean Kingdom, where Quan watched the animal circus, rode roller coasters, and played with crane catchers. Quan's trip to the theme parks also satisfied her wish to visit and play in the amusement park and the zoo. 

In October 2021, Quan Hongchan participated in Beijing 2022 Winter Olympic Games countdown 100 days theme activities hosted by CCTV,  where she performed "Together to the Future" and "See You in Beijing" with many Olympic champions and celebrities. On 26 December, the music video of "See You in Beijing" sung by 55 Olympic champions, including Quan Hongchan, was released.

References 

2007 births
Living people
Chinese female divers
Divers at the 2020 Summer Olympics
Medalists at the 2020 Summer Olympics
Olympic divers of China
Olympic gold medalists for China
Olympic medalists in diving
People from Zhanjiang
World Aquatics Championships medalists in diving
Sportspeople from Guangdong
21st-century Chinese women